Galbella is an exclusively Old World genus of beetles in the family Buprestidae, placed in the monotypic subfamily Galbellinae. It contains the following species:

 Galbella abyssinica Kerremans, 1899
 Galbella acaciae Descarpentries & Mateu, 1965
 Galbella acuminata Bellamy in Bellamy & Holm, 1986
 Galbella adamantina Bellamy in Bellamy & Holm, 1986
 Galbella aeneola (Obenberger, 1936)
 Galbella africana (Kerremans, 1907)
 Galbella albanensis Bellamy in Bellamy & Holm, 1986
 Galbella alia Bellamy in Bellamy & Holm, 1986
 Galbella angolensis Théry, 1947
 Galbella anamita (Obenberger, 1924)
 Galbella anniae (Obenberger, 1936)
 Galbella antiqua Théry, 1905
 Galbella argodi Bellamy in Bellamy & Holm, 1986
 Galbella atricolor (Abeille de Perrin, 1907)
 Galbella auberti Théry, 1930
 Galbella bartoni (Obenberger, 1936)
 Galbella beccarii (Gestro, 1872)
 Galbella byrrhoides Théry, 1905
 Galbella caesia Bellamy in Bellamy & Holm, 1986
 Galbella capeneri Cobos, 1953
 Galbella citri (Obenberger, 1936)
 Galbella coomani Théry, 1930
 Galbella cuneiformis Kerremans, 1898
 Galbella delagoa Bellamy in Bellamy & Holm, 1986
 Galbella dukeorum Bellamy, 2000
 Galbella ennediana Descarpentries & Mateu, 1965
 Galbella fabichi (Obenberger, 1936)
 Galbella felix (Marseul, 1866)
 Galbella gigantea (Théry, 1955)
 Galbella gracilis Bellamy in Bellamy & Holm, 1986
 Galbella grandis Bellamy in Bellamy & Holm, 1986
 Galbella gridellii (Obenberger, 1936)
 Galbella hantamensis Bellamy in Bellamy & Holm, 1986
 Galbella harti (Janson, 1891)
 Galbella herera (Obenberger, 1936)
 Galbella heteromorpha Bellamy in Bellamy & Holm, 1986
 Galbella hofferi (Obenberger, 1937)
 Galbella holmi Kalashian, 1996
 Galbella holzschuhi Volkovitsh, 2008
 Galbella hovana (Fairmaire, 1902)
 Galbella howas Kerremans, 1894
 Galbella indica Obenberger, 1922
 Galbella jeanelli Théry, 1939
 Galbella jocosa Théry, 1930
 Galbella kalahari Bellamy in Bellamy & Holm, 1986
 Galbella khurdae (Obenberger, 1924)
 Galbella lacustris (Obenberger, 1924)
 Galbella lata (Fairmaire, 1900)
 Galbella levis Kerremans, 1896
 Galbella limbata Théry, 1905
 Galbella maindroni Bellamy in Bellamy & Holm, 1986
 Galbella marseuli (Obenberger, 1936)
 Galbella muelleri (Obenberger, 1936)
 Galbella namibia Bellamy in Bellamy & Holm, 1986
 Galbella nanula (Obenberger, 1939)
 Galbella natalensis Bellamy in Bellamy & Holm, 1986
 Galbella nigeriensis Bellamy in Bellamy & Holm, 1986
 Galbella nyassica Bellamy in Bellamy & Holm, 1986
 Galbella occidentalis Bellamy in Bellamy & Holm, 1986
 Galbella omaruru Bellamy in Bellamy & Holm, 1986
 Galbella pachyscheloides Bellamy in Bellamy & Holm, 1986
 Galbella parma Bellamy in Bellamy & Holm, 1986
 Galbella perrieri (Fairmaire, 1900)
 Galbella perroti Descarpentries & Villiers, 1964
 Galbella polula Bellamy in Bellamy & Holm, 1986
 Galbella postuma Bellamy in Bellamy & Holm, 1986
 Galbella purpurea Bellamy in Bellamy & Holm, 1986
 Galbella radja (Obenberger, 1936)
 Galbella raffrayi Théry, 1930
 Galbella regina (Obenberger, 1936)
 Galbella simula Bellamy in Bellamy & Holm, 1986
 Galbella somereni Théry, 1930
 Galbella stilla Bellamy in Bellamy & Holm, 1986
 Galbella strandi Obenberger, 1922
 Galbella trachydea (Fairmaire, 1902)
 Galbella triangularis Théry, 1923
 Galbella troetroe Bellamy in Bellamy & Holm, 1986
 Galbella turneri Théry, 1941
 Galbella ukerewensis (Obenberger, 1937)
 Galbella vansoni (Obenberger, 1936)
 Galbella villiersi (Obenberger, 1950)
 Galbella violacea Westwood, 1848
 Galbella zambesica (Obenberger, 1936)
 Galbella zanzibarica (Fairmaire, 1884)
 Galbella zyziphi (Obenberger, 1936)

References

Buprestidae genera